Angela Hannah McCarthy is a New Zealand history academic, and as of 2018 is a full professor at the University of Otago.

Academic career

After a PhD titled  ' 'Seas may divide' : Irish migration to New Zealand as portrayed in personal correspondence, 1840-1937'  at Trinity College Dublin, she moved to the University of Otago, rising to full professor. In 2008 McCarthy received $612,000 in Marsden grant funding.

Books
McCarthy is the author of books including:
 McCarthy, Angela. Irish Migrants in New Zealand, 1840-1937: the Desired Haven. Vol. 3. Boydell Press, 2005.
 McCarthy, Angela. Personal narratives of Irish and Scottish migration, 1921-65: For spirit and adventure. Oxford University Press, 2017.
 McCarthy, Angela. Scottishness and Irishness in New Zealand since 1840. Manchester University Press, 2011.

Her edited volumes include:
 McCarthy, Angela, ed. A global clan: Scottish migrant networks and identities since the eighteenth century. Vol. 36. IB Tauris, 2006.
 McCarthy, Angela, and MacKenzie, John, eds. Global Migrations: The Scottish Diaspora since 1600. Edinburgh University Press, 2016.
 Leckie, Jacqueline, McCarthy, Angela, and Wanhalla, Angela, eds. Migrant Cross-Cultural Encounters in Asia and the Pacific. Routledge, 2016.

References

Living people
New Zealand women historians
Alumni of Trinity College Dublin
Academic staff of the University of Otago
21st-century New Zealand historians
Year of birth missing (living people)
New Zealand women writers